The 2007 St. George Illawarra Dragons season was the ninth in the joint venture club's history. The Dragons competed in the NRL's 2007 premiership season. The team finished thirteenth in the regular season, finishing the lowest they ever had and as a result of that, missing out on finals.

Squad gains and losses

Ladder

Ladder Progression

Season results

References 

St. George Illawarra Dragons
St. George Illawarra Dragons seasons
2007 in rugby league by club